Thorn in the flesh is a phrase of New Testament origin used to describe an annoyance, or trouble in one's life, drawn from Paul the Apostle's use of the phrase in his Second Epistle to the Corinthians 12:7–9:

Other biblical passages where "thorn" is used as a metaphor are:

The standard English translation was popularised by the 1611 King James Version of the Bible. Among earlier translations, the 1526 Tyndale Bible  uses "vnquyetnes" ("unquietness") rather than "thorn", and the 1557 Geneva Bible refers to a "pricke in the fleshe".

Biblical meaning 
Paul mentions what the "thorn in his flesh" was in 2 Corinthians 12:6-7 when he said (Verse 6) "...lest any man should think of me above that which he seeth me to be, or that he heareth of me. (Verse 7) And lest I should be exalted above measure through 'the abundance of revelations', there was given to me 'a thorn in the flesh'..." from "the abundance of revelations" and how people perceived him or "...man should think of me above that which he seeth me to be, or that he heareth of me."

Paul does not specify the nature of his "thorn", and his other epistles do not directly address the topic. Throughout church history, there has been a significant amount of speculation about what Paul was referring to, although scholars such as Philip Edgcumbe Hughes, F. F. Bruce and Ralph P. Martin conclude that definite identification of the thorn is impossible with the evidence available. Other scholars such as B. J. Oropeza, M. David Litwa, and Paula R. Gooder suggest that the thorn refers to the messenger of Satan who harmed Paul during his third heaven experience.

The "thorn" is most commonly interpreted in relation to persecutions or hardships Paul faced.

Other interpretations include:
 One pre-Vatican II Roman Catholic writer thought that it denotes suggestions of impiety.
 Paul's agony over Jewish rejection of the gospel
 A reference to Paul's opponents
 A physical ailment

Modern usage 
The phrase "thorn in the flesh" continues to be used as a metaphor for "a source of continual annoyance or trouble". It is synonymous with the phrase "thorn in the side", which is also of biblical origin, based on the description in Numbers 33:55. As an example usage, the Oxford English Dictionary cites E. M. Forster's 1924 novel A Passage to India, in which Nawab Bahadur says, "I can be a thorn in Mr. Turton's flesh, and if he asks me I accept the invitation."

See also
 Thorns, spines, and prickles

References

 

New Testament words and phrases
Paul the Apostle
Christian terminology
Second Epistle to the Corinthians